This is a list of Portuguese novelists.

C
Mario de Carvalho (born 1944)
Camilo Castelo Branco (1825–1890)
Luísa Costa Gomes
Afonso Cruz (born 1971)

D
Júlio Dinis (1839–1871)
José Riço Direitinho (born 1965)

F
Rosa Lobato de Faria (1932–2010)
Vergílio Ferreira (1916–1996)
Raquel Freire (born 1973)

G
Almeida Garrett (1799–1854)
Olga Gonçalves (1929–2004)
Pedro Guilherme-Moreira (born 1969)

H
Alexandre Herculano (1810–1877)
Maria Teresa Horta (born 1937)

L
António Lobo Antunes (born 1942)

M
valter hugo mãe (born 1971)
Dulce Maria Cardoso (born 1964)
Guilherme de Melo (1931–2013)
Luís de Sttau Monteiro (1926–1993)

N
Fernando Goncalves Namora (1919–1989)
Vitorino Nemésio (1901–1978)
António de Vasconcelos Nogueira (born 1961)

O
Raquel Ochoa (born 1980)
Carlos de Oliveira (1921–1981)

P
José Luís Peixoto (born 1974)
Ana Teresa Pereira (born 1958)
Ana Plácido (1831–1895)

Q
José Maria de Eça de Queirós (1845–1900)
Francisco Teixeira de Queiroz (1848–1919)

R
Wanda Ramos (1948–1998)
Aquilino Ribeiro (1885–1963)

S
Rui Miguel Saramago (born 1969)
José Saramago (1922–2010)

T
Gonçalo M. Tavares (born 1970)
Miguel Sousa Tavares (born 1952)

Z
Richard Zimler (born 1956)

See also
 List of Portuguese writers
 Portuguese literature
 List of novelists by nationality

References 

Novelists
Portuguese